Carlene Davis (born c.1953) is a Jamaican gospel and reggae singer active since the 1970s. Successful since the early 1980s as a reggae artist, she survived cancer in the mid-1990s, after which she dedicated her career to gospel music. She has released over ten albums.

Biography
Davis was born in Colonels Ridge, Clarendon Parish and moved to England with her parents at the age of fourteen, where she began to perform professionally a year later, playing guitar in an all-female band before joining the pop trio Toreadores. She then moved to Toronto, Ontario, Canada where she lived for eight years. Davis initially found fame as a reggae singer. She recorded her debut single in Toronto, a version of "Leaving on a Jet Plane", and had a local hit with a version of Jimmy Cliff's "The Harder They Come".

In 1980, she returned to Jamaica to advance her career, and performed at the Reggae Sunsplash festival in 1981. Also in 1981, she finished runner-up in the Festival Song Contest with "Peace and Love". She had hits in Jamaica with "Like Old Friends Do", "It Must Be Love", "Winnie Mandela", "Stealing Love on the Side", "Dial My Number" and "Going Down to Paradise", and released a string of albums in the 1980s and first half of the 1990s, becoming one of Jamaica's more established female reggae artists. In 1985, she recorded a duet with Gregory Isaacs titled "Feeling Irie" on his Private Beach Party album. In 1990, she was named Best Female Vocalist at the Caribbean Music Awards. She toured as part of the Reggae Sunsplash World Peace Tour in 1991.

In 1996, she was diagnosed with breast cancer and her Christian faith became a more important part of her life. She returned to recording gospel music, which she had first recorded in the early 1990s. She released the album Vessel in 1998, and in 2000 her single "This Island Needs Jesus" was a major hit in several Caribbean countries. She became involved in cancer charity work, with half of the proceeds from her 2003 album Author and Finisher going to the Jamaica Cancer Society. Davis has continued to perform regularly, including appearances at the Redbones Blues Revue, Fun in the Son, and Live on the Waterfront.

In 2000, Davis was named minister of music for The Family Church on the Rock in Kingston. In 2006, she gained a doctorate in pastoral counselling from the Trinity Theological Seminary in South Florida.

By the mid-2000s, Davis had her own recording studio, Judah Recording, and the Glory Music productions record label, run with her husband Tommy Cowan.

In 2014, Davis released the album Dripping Blood, and announced that 25% of royalties would go to U.S.-based charity Samaritan's Purse to fund its work fighting Ebola in Liberia. The album reached number 3 on the Billboard Reggae Albums chart.

Her latest album, The Assignment, released in 2018, includes a duet with Marion Hall and features contributions from Tyrone Downie, Steven "Cat" Coore, Dean Fraser, and Lloyd Parks.

Discography
I Remember (19??), Pioneer International
Ism Schism (1978), Sonic Sounds
At the Right Time (1980), Carib Gems
Paradise (1984), Orange
Yesterday Today Forever (198?), Nicole Music
Taking Control (1987), Nicole Music
Reggae Songbird (1990), Peter Pan
Gospel Reggae (1991), VP
No Bias (1991), Sonic Sounds
Carlene Davis (1992), Gee Street
Taking Control (1992), VP
Songs of Bob Marley (1993), Eko/VP
Christmas Reggae Rock (1992), Orchard
Jesus Is Only a Prayer Away (1992)
Songs of Freedom (1993), Lagoon
Echoes of Love (1995), VP
Passion & Pain (1995), Avex
Vessel (1998), Jet Star
Redeemed (2000), VP
Alive for Jesus (2002), Gospel Times
Christmas Everyday (2002)
Author and Finisher (2003), Glory/VP
Rock Me Jesus (2005), VP/Universal
True Worship (2009), VP/Glory
Dripping Blood (2014), VP/Glory
The Assignment (2018), VP

Compilations
The 15 Classics (1991), Sonic Sounds
Best of Glory (2009), VP

Songs in other projects
 Caribbean Gospel: Book One, "One Day at a Time", "Give All to Jesus" (2001), VP
 Caribbean Gospel: Book Two, "I Saw the Light" (with Junior Tucker), "I Surrender All" (2006), VP
 Caribbean Gospel: Book Three, "Rivers of Babylon/I Shall Not be Moved" (2009), VP

References

External links
 

1950s births
Jamaican reggae singers
Jamaican gospel singers
Jamaican Christians
Living people
People from Clarendon Parish, Jamaica
VP Records artists